Lake Kerr is an unincorporated community and census-designated place (CDP) in northeastern Marion County, Florida, United States, surrounding the lake of the same name.

Lake Kerr was first listed as a CDP for the 2020 census, at which time the population was 1,843.

Demographics

References 

Census-designated places in Marion County, Florida
Census-designated places in Florida